Gais is a comune (municipality) in South Tyrol in northern Italy, located about  north-east of the city of Bolzano.

Geography

Gais is one of the three communes of South Tyrol whose name, for the reason of sounding "romantic", remained unchanged by the early 20th century renaming programme which aimed at replacing mostly German place names with Italianised versions, the other two being Plaus and Lana.

Gais borders the following municipalities: Bruneck, Sand in Taufers, Pfalzen, Percha, and Mühlwald.

Frazioni
The municipality of Gais contains the frazioni (subdivisions, mainly villages and hamlets) Lanebach (Lana di Gais), Mühlbach (Riomolino), Tesselberg (Montassilone) and Uttenheim (Villa Ottone).

History

Coat-of-arms
The emblem is party per bend or and azure with two bendlets azure; the remaining field represents a sable eagle with a halo and the head facing left. The eagle symbolizes John the Evangelist which the parish church is dedicated and the two azure bendlets the two castles Kehlburg and Neuhaus. The emblem was adopted in 1956.

International relations

Twin towns — Sister cities
Gais is twinned with:

  Coburg, Germany

Society

Linguistic distribution
According to the 2011 census, 97.05% of the population speak German, 2.65% Italian and 0.29% Ladin as first language.

Demographic evolution

References

External links
  Homepage of the municipality

Municipalities of South Tyrol
Rieserferner-Ahrn Nature Park